Krishna Bahadur Kunwar after 1848 CE known as, Krishna Bahadur Kunwar Rana was the Nepalese politician, administrator, military general and minister of state. He served as the acting Prime Minister of Nepal upon the demise of his elder brother Bam Bahadur Kunwar from 25 May 1857 to 28 June 1857. He also served as the Commander-In-Chief of the Nepalese Army between 1857 and 1862.

Personal life

He was born as son of Bal Narsingh Kunwar and Ganesh Kumari Thapa, daughter of Kaji Nain Singh Thapa of the politically affluent Thapa family. He was the younger brother of Jung Bahadur Kunwar Rana and Bam Bahadur Kunwar as well as the elder brother of Ranodip Singh Kunwar and Dhir Shamsher Kunwar Rana. Kunwars came to political power being close relatives of the same Thapa family.

Career
On the night of 14 September 1846, Jung Bahadur Kunwar and his brothers massacred around 29 nobles in the Kot Massacre. Khadga Vikram Shah attempted to attack Krishna Bahadur Kunwar and was killed subsequently by Krishna's youngest brother Dhir Shamsher Kunwar. In the aftermath of the massacre, Jung Bahadur appointed his brothers and nephews to the highest ranks of the government.

Krishna Bahadur Kunwar served as the Governor of Palpa between 1846 and 1849. He served as the Chief Administrator of Morang, Saptari, Parsa, Bara, Rautahat and Sarlahi districts in the year 1849. He served as the acting Prime Minister of Nepal upon the demise of his elder brother Bam Bahadur Kunwar from 25 May 1857 to 28 June 1857. He also served as the Commander-In-Chief of the Nepalese Army between 1857 and 1862.

Death
He died on 9 August 1863.

References

Books

Bibliography 
 
 
 
 
 
 
 

 
 
 
 

Prime ministers of Nepal
1863 deaths
Rana dynasty
19th-century prime ministers of Nepal
19th-century Nepalese nobility
Nepalese Hindus